The Selangor Royal Family consists of the family members of the Sultan of Selangor. It currently consists of Sharafuddin of Selangor and his close relations.

The Sultan and his family belong  to the House of Daeng Chelak. The ruling house had founded the monarchy in 1745 and continues to be in power to this day.

Background
Members of Selangor Royal Family are descendants of the first Sultan of Selangor, Salehudin of Selangor. He is the eldest son of Daeng Chelak, one of the five Bugis warriors that rose into power in the Malay Kingdom during the Bendahara dynasty. They are considered as the viceregal house of Riau in Riau-Lingga Sultanate, and can trace their ancestry from the Bugis Royal House in Luwu, Sulawesi.

On 5 November 1903, upon ascending the throne as the fifth Sultan, Sulaiman of Selangor decreed that all his descendants will carry the hereditary first name Tengku instead of Raja. The naming tradition was kept to this day.

Roles

Several members of the royal family are also the members of the Selangor Council of the Royal Court. The council role is to assist the Sultan in carrying out his duty to the state by acting as an advisory body to the Sultan. Some members are made Orang Besar Istana or in English, palace dignitaries, whom are responsible for any engagement involving the palace.

Titles and styles 
The full title of the Sultan of Selangor is Sultan dan Yang di-Pertuan Selangor Darul Ehsan Serta Segala Daerah Takluknya, or in English, The Sultan and Sovereign Ruler of Selangor Abode of Sincerity and its Sovereign Dependencie.

The title Tengku Ampuan Selangor may be conferred to a spouse of the Sultan, given that she is of a royal descent. The title Tengku Permaisuri Selangor can be conferred instead to the spouse that is not of royal descent. The regnal name of the consort of the Sultan will be the title, followed by her given name. For example: Tengku Ampuan Rahimah and Tengku Permaisuri Norashikin.

The heir apparent is conferred the title Raja Muda Selangor or in English, the Crown Prince of Selangor. His wife will received the title Raja Puan Muda Selangor if she is of royal descent.

The Sultan's mother will received the title Paduka Bonda Raja upon his ascension to the throne. For example, Sharafuddin of Selangor's mother is styled Paduka Bonda Raja, Raja Nur Saidatul Ehsan binti Tengku Badar Shah.

The members of the royal family are style as such:

Members

, the members are:

Immediate family
Sharafuddin of Selangor and Tengku Permaisuri Norashikin, Tengku Permaisuri Selangor (the Sultan and his consort)
Tengku Zerafina and Colin Salem Parbury (the Sultan's daughter and son-in-law)
Tengku Zatashah and Aubry Rahim Mennesson (the Sultan's daughter and son-in-law)
Tengku Amir Shah, Raja Muda Selangor (the Sultan's son and heir apparent)
Permaisuri Siti Aishah (the Sultan's step-mother and Salahuddin of Selangor's widow)
Tengku Sulaiman Shah, Tengku Laksamana Selangor and Tunku Kamariah Aminah Maimunah Iskandariah of Johor, Tengku Puan Laksamana Selangor (the Sultan's brother and sister-in-law)
Tengku Shakirinal Amin Mahmood Ismail Alam Shah and Che' Puan Nadiah Khan (the Sultan's nephew and niece-in-law)
Tengku Mahmood (the Sultan's grandnephew)
Tengku Sulaiman (the Sultan's grandnephew)
Tengku Abdul Aziz (the Sultan's grandnephew)
Tengku Kamariah Khaleiyah Khadijah Kathirah Zanariah Ihsan (the Sultan's grandniece)
Tengku Salehuddin Ismail Iskandar Ibrahim Hishamuddin Shah, Tengku Indera Bijaya Diraja Selangor (the Sultan's nephew)
Tengku Ibrahim (the Sultan's grandnephew) 
Tengku Shahrain Iskandar Ismail Abdul Majid and Che' Puan Melati Artia (the Sultan's nephew and niece-in-law)
Tengku Sharifuddin Ibrahim Ismail Iskandar Abdul Aziz Shah and Che' Puan Juliana Sophie Evans (the Sultan's nephew and niece-in-law)
Tengku Kamiliah Zanariah Josephine Ehsan Shah (the Sultan's grandniece)
Tengku Puteri Kathira Zanariah Ihsan Maimunah Aminah Iskandar (The Sultan's niece)
Tengku Puteri Zahariah or Ku Yah (the Sultan's sister)
Syed Budriz Putra Jamalullail of Perlis, Engku Maharaja Lela Setia Paduka Selangor and Tengku Aressa Helanie of Kelantan (the Sultan's nephew and niece-in-law)
Syed Aqil Harryth Jamalullail of Perlis (the Sultan's grandnephew)
Sharifah Allyssa Hanis of Perlis (the Sultan's grandniece)
Sharifah Rima Irwani Jamalullail of Perlis and Wan Muhammad Shazly (the Sultan's niece and nephew-in-law)
Wan Mohammad Khalil Putra Jamalullail of Perlis (the Sultan's grandnephew)
Wan Puteri Khadijah Jamalullail of Perlis (the Sultan's grandniece)
Sharifah Emilia Safina Jamalullail of Perlis (the Sultan's niece)
Raja Sheena Frida of Perak and Iskandar Alam bin Zainal Abidin (the Sultan's niece and nephew-in-law)
Megat Muhammad Faez  and An-Nuura Nasuha Rasnatrazia (the Sultan's nephew and niece-in-law)
Tengku Abdul Samad Shah, Tengku Panglima Besar Selangor (the Sultan's brother)
Tengku Musahiddin Shah, Tengku Seri Perkasa Diraja Selangor (the Sultan's nephew)
Tengku Munazirah and Izzat Ilyas bin Muhammad Nasir (the Sultan's niece and nephew-in-law)
Tengku Puteri Arafiah and Abdul Aziz bin Shariff (the Sultan's sister and brother-in-law)
Putera Azamuddin Shah (the Sultan's nephew)
Tengku Ahmad Shah, Tengku Panglima Raja Selangor and Tunku Irinah of Negeri Sembilan, Tengku Puan Panglima Raja Selangor (the Sultan's brother and sister-in-law)
Tengku Alam Shah Amiruddin (the Sultan's nephew)
Tengku Alana Iman Shahirah and Faiz Dhiyaulhaq bin Suffian (the Sultan's niece and nephew-in-law)
Tengku Puteri Nur Marina and Haldun Elci (the Sultan's sister and brother-in-law)
Hiko Momoji, born Atilla Elci (the Sultan's nephew)
• Tengku Puteri Sofiah 

°Raja Jasrill Ashrul Raja Jaafar(the Sultan's nephew) 

°Raja Jasrina Ashrinn Raja Jaafar (the Sultan's niece) 
Tengku Puteri Nor Zehan, Tengku Puan Panglima Perlis and Syed Zainol Anwar Jamalullail, Tengku Syarif Panglima Perlis (the Sultan's sister and brother-in-law)
Syed Haizam Hishamuddin Putra Jamalullail of Perlis, Engku Panglima Setia Diraja Selangor and Nurlin binti Muhammad Salleh of Perak (the Sultan's nephew and niece-in-law)
Sharifah Nur Alara Budriah Jamalullail (the Sultan’s Grandniece) 
Syed Azlan Salahuddin Putra Jamalullail (the Sultan’s Grandnephew) 
Sharifah Nur Zahra Hatijah Jamalullail (the Sultan’s Grandniece) 
Syed Jufri Dhiauddin Putra Jamalullail of Perlis and Che’ Puan Siti Sarah Noble (the Sultan's nephew and niece-in-law) 
Syed Ayden Husain Mateen Aziz Putra Jamalullail of Perlis (The Sultan’s Grandnephew) 
Sharifah Eliza Cornelia Putri Jamalullail of Perlis and YTM Tunku Dato’ Dr Muzaffar Shah Tunku Jaafar Laksmana of Kedah (the Sultan's niece and nephew-in-law) 
Tunku Inaya Rahimah (the Sultan’s Grandniece)

Extended family
Tengku Putra, Tengku Indera Pahlawan Diraja Selangor and Pengiran Hajah Zaliha of Brunei (the Sultan's first cousin and cousin-in-law)
Tengku Saidatul Rehan (the Sultan's first cousin children)
Tengku Saifan Rafhan Putra (the Sultan's first cousin children)
Tengku Ainul Nur Syuhada (the Sultan's first cousin children)
Tengku Nazri (the Sultan's cousin)
Tengku Puteri Insani (the Sultan's cousin)
Tengku Shamsulbhari and Tengku Zubaidah binti Tengku Mohammad (the Sultan's cousin and cousin-in-law)
Tengku Hishamuddin Zaizi and Che Puan Hezeita binti Muhammad Hafidz (the Sultan's cousin and cousin-in-law)
Tengku Puteri Saidatul Aini (the Sultan's cousin)
Tengku Rashad, Engku Orang Kaya Diraja Selangor (the Sultan's cousin)
Tengku Anisha (the Sultan's cousin)
Tengku Lutfi (the Sultan's cousin)
Tengku Sakinah (the Sultan's cousin)
Tengku Shukri (the Sultan's cousin)
Tengku Narima (the Sultan's cousin)
Tengku Muhammad Najib (the Sultan's cousin)
Tengku Iskandar, Tengku Seri Andika Diraja Selangor (the Sultan's cousin)
Tengku Badariah (the Sultan's cousin)
Tengku Aina (the Sultan's cousin)
Tengku Nur Anuwar (the Sultan's grandaunt) 
Tengku Mahmud Shah Al-Haj (the Sultan's granduncle)
Tengku Ardy Esfandiari, Tengku Seri Paduka Shah Bandar and Toh Puan Siti Rahilah Mohd Hashim (the Sultan's first cousin once removed and cousin-in-law)
Tengku Ezrique Ezzuddean, Bentara Raja and Che Puan Syamim Farid (the Sultan's second cousin and second cousin-in-law)
Tengku Ezzer Ezzaruddean and Che Puan Juliana Razman (the Sultan's second cousin and second cousin-in-law)
Tengku Ezran Ezzaeddean and Che Puan Nur Syazana Mustakim (the Sultan's second cousin and second cousin-in-law)

See also
 Tengku Zafrul Aziz
 Nick Kyrgios
 Line of succession to the Malaysian thrones#Selangor
 Family tree of Selangor monarchs
 List of honours of the Selangor Royal Family by country

References

External links

Royal House of Selangor